Hokuto Yoshino (吉野北人; Yoshino Hokuto, born March 6, 1997) is a Japanese singer, performer and actor. He is a member of J-Pop group The Rampage from Exile Tribe.

Yoshino is represented with LDH.

Early life 
Hokuto Yoshino was born on March 6, 1997, in Miyazaki Prefecture, Japan. He has been playing basketball since third grade. When he was in elementary school, his basketball coach told him that he should join the entertainment industry which sparked his first interest in that sector. In junior high school, he won the Miyazaki Basketball Tournament (a prefectural championship) and the best player award. At that time, he also got to know Exile through researching them after a classmate mentioned his resemblance to Exile's Takahiro. This led him to aspire to become a full-fledged singer from high school on. The first time he sang in front of an audience was at a cultural festival of his high school where he performed the song "I love you" by Yutaka Ozaki. Afterwards, Yoshino started to take simple singing lessons and participate in karaoke competitions in his hometown. Ultimately, he also tried out for various auditions.

His classmates in high school included Kanta Sato and fellow The Rampage member Shogo Iwaya.

Career 
Since he liked Exile, Yoshino decided to participate in the VOCAL BATTLE AUDITION 4 - For Young People with Dreams at the age of 17. During the training camp of the audition he struggled with learning to dance since he had no prior experience but was assisted by Ryuta Hidaka (now member of Ballistik Boyz). At last, Yoshino passed the audition as one of three winners out of 30 thousand contestants alongside Kazuma Kawamura and Riku Aoyama and became a vocal candidate for THE RAMPAGE in April 2014. He was selected as an official member of the group after completing their musha shugyo.

In January 2017, The Rampage from Exile Tribe made their debut with the single "Lightning".

In 2018, he made his acting debut in the film Prince of Legend, playing the role of "Team Next's" prince Koki Tendo. On February 14, 2019, he attended the PRINCE OF LEGEND PREMIUM LIVE SHOW, a fan-meeting with the whole Prince of Legend cast, at Yokohama Arena. There, he performed "Too Shy", a cover of Kajagoogoo's 80s hit and insert song of the film, with Makoto Hasegawa and Itsuki Fujiwara who played the remaining members of "Team Next". On September 7 in the same year, Yoshino was invited to the 29th Tokyo Girls Collection (Autumn/Winter) at Saitama Super Arena together with the main cast of the movie High & Low The Worst in which he stars as Tsukasa Takajo. This marked the first time he attended any fashion related event and walked a runway in his career. A few months after, he also appeared at the 30th Tokyo Girls Collection (Spring/Summer) alongside the main cast of the movie Kizoku Tanjou -Prince Of Legend-.

Discography

Participating work

Filmography

Films

TV Dramas

TV Shows

Commercials

Game

References 

LDH (company) artists
Living people
People from Miyazaki Prefecture
Musicians from Miyazaki Prefecture
21st-century Japanese male actors
1997 births
21st-century Japanese male singers
21st-century Japanese singers